SMArt 155 is a German 155 mm artillery round, designed for a long range, indirect fire top attack role against armoured vehicles.  The SMArt carrier shell contains two submunitions with infrared sensor and millimeter wave radar, which descend over the battlefield on ballutes and attack hardened targets with explosively formed penetrator warheads.  Built with multiple redundant self-destruct mechanisms. They fall outside of the category of submunition weapons which were later prohibited by the 2008 Convention on Cluster Munitions.

The name SMArt 155 is a contraction of its German name Suchzünder Munition für die Artillerie 155 (meaning "sensor-fuse munition for 155mm artillery").  SMArt is manufactured by GIWS mbh (Gesellschaft für Intelligente WirkSysteme mbH), a partnership between German armaments companies Rheinmetall and Diehl BGT Defence.

The projectile entered development in 1989, and GIWS started full-rate production for the German Army in 1997. SMArt was first deployed by the Bundeswehr in 2000, and has been sold to the armies of Switzerland, Greece and Australia.

Design

SMArt 155 is a 155 mm NATO artillery round designed to be fired from the Panzerhaubitze 2000 and the M109 howitzers, including the Paladin variant. It consists of a  heavy artillery projectile containing two autonomous, sensor-fused, fire-and-forget submunitions. The submunitions each contain a high-penetration EFP warhead for use against heavy armoured fighting vehicles such as main battle tanks. The EFP warhead uses a heavy metal liner.

After the submunition is released it opens a parachute. While slowly descending, the submunition rotates, scanning the area below with an infra-red sensor and a millimeter wave radar.

Utilization of several types of sensors allows SMArt 155 to be used in all terrain types and weather conditions.

Operation

Competing systems
US artillery largely deploys the M712 Copperhead laser-guided round for the anti-tank role.  GIWS formed a partnership with US defence contractor Alliant Techsystems, hoping to sell SMArt 155 to the United States armed forces; to date no sale has been made. The US developed the similar M898 SADARM system (which also descended on a ballute to attack the top surfaces of armoured vehicles), but this was discontinued in favour of the GPS guided M982 Excalibur round.

SMArt 155 is very similar to the 155 BONUS system; BONUS descends on a system of winglets rather than a parachute.

Operators

Current operators
  Australian Army – replaced M712 Copperhead
  German Army – known as DM702A1, used with the Panzerhaubitze 2000
  Hellenic Army – used with the Panzerhaubitze 2000
  Swiss Army
  British Army – known as BSFM, used with the AS-90
  Armed Forces of Ukraine – used with the Panzerhaubitze 2000

GIWS and its partners have also demonstrated SMArt to a number of other armies, including those of the United States, the United Arab Emirates (for use in their existing G6 howitzer), Peru, and India.

References

External links

 Intelligent ammunition  on Diehl's website
 Artillery rounds on Rheimetall-DeTec.de

155mm artillery shells
Anti-tank rounds
Cluster munition
Fire-and-forget weapons
Guided artillery shells
Military equipment introduced in the 1990s
Post–Cold War weapons of Germany
Rheinmetall